The Uganda national baseball team is the national team representing Uganda in international competitions in the sport of baseball.

Tournament record

All-Africa Games

References

National baseball teams in Africa
Baseball